Events in the year 1952 in Mexico.

Incumbents

Federal government
 President: Miguel Alemán Valdés (until November 30), Adolfo Ruiz Cortines (starting December 1)
 Interior Secretary (SEGOB): Ernesto P. Uruchurtu/Ángel Carvajal Bernal
 Secretary of Foreign Affairs (SRE): Manuel Tello Baurraud/Luis Padilla Nervo
 Communications Secretary (SCT): Carlos Lazo
 Education Secretary (SEP): Manuel Gual Vidal/Jose Angel Ceniceros
 Secretary of Defense (SEDENA): Gilberto R. Limón/Matías Ramos 
 Secretary of Navy: Alberto J. Pawling/Rodolfo Sánchez Taboada
 Secretary of Labor and Social Welfare: Manuel Ramírez Vázquez/Adolfo López Mateos

Supreme Court

 President of the Supreme Court: Roque Estrada Reynoso

Governors
 Aguascalientes: Edmundo Gámez Orozco
 Baja California: Alfonso García González
 Campeche: Manuel López Hernández
 Chiapas: Francisco J. Grajales/Efraín Aranda Osorio
 Chihuahua: Oscar Soto Maynez
 Coahuila: Ramón Cepeda López
 Colima: Jesús González Lugo
 Durango: Enrique Torres Sánchez
 Guanajuato: José Aguilar y Maya
 Guerrero: Alejandro Gómez Maganda/Darío L. Arrieta Mateos
 Hidalgo: Vicente Aguirre del Castillo/Quintín Rueda Villagrán
 Jalisco: José de Jesús González Gallo
 State of Mexico: Salvador Sánchez Colín
 Michoacán: Dámaso Cárdenas del Río
 Morelos: Ernesto Escobar Muñoz/Rodolfo López de Nava
 Nayarit: José Limón Guzmán
 Nuevo León: Ignacio Morones Prieto/José S. Vivanco
 Oaxaca: Manuel Mayoral Heredia/Manuel Cabrera Carrasqueado
 Puebla: Rafael Ávila Camacho
 Querétaro: Octavio Mondragón Guerra/Juan C. Gorraéz
 San Luis Potosí: Ismael Salas Penieres/Manuel Álvarez
 Sinaloa: Enrique Pérez Arce 
 Sonora: Ignacio Soto/Álvaro Obregón Tapia
 Tabasco: Francisco Javier Santamaría
 Tamaulipas: Horacio Terán
 Tlaxcala: Felipe Mazarraza	 
 Veracruz: Marco Antonio Muñoz Turnbull
 Yucatán: Humberto Esquivel Medina/Tomás Marentes Miranda
 Zacatecas: José Minero Roque

Events

 The Miss Mexico organization is formed. 
 The Gorditas Doña Tota restaurant chain is established in Ciudad Victoria, Tamaulipas by Carlota Murillo. 
 January 16: The North Territory of Baja California is admitted as the State of Baja California.
 April: The trade union confederation called Confederación Revolucionaria de Obreros y Campesinos (CROC) is founded. 
 July 7: 1952 Mexican general election.

Film

 List of Mexican films of 1952.

Sport

 1951–52 Mexican Primera División season.
 Aguila de Veracruz win the Mexican League.
 Mexico at the 1952 Summer Olympics.

Births
January 22 – Iliana Godoy Patiño, narrator, researcher, and poet ("Contralianza" and "Mastil en Tierra") (d. 2017).
February 24 — Jesús Aguilar Padilla, politician (PRI) and lawyer; Governor of Sinaloa 2004–2010.
March 23 — Villano III (Arturo Díaz Mendoza), wrestler (d. 2018).
April 27 — Federico Barbosa Gutiérrez, jurist and politician, member of the Congress of the Union (2003–2006); (d. 2018).
June 16 — Salvador Pineda, soap opera actor
 October 19 — Verónica Castro, actress, singer, producer, former model, and presenter.
November 21 – Jorge Arturo García Rubí, lawyer, politician (PRI), Governor of Morelos (May–September 2000).
 November 24 — Laura León, actress and singer
December 5 — Miguel Ángel Yunes Linares, politician (PRI); Governor of Veracruz 2016 - 2018
Date unknown — Enrique Caballero Vela, actor (d. 2018).

Deaths
 12 June — Genovevo de la O, general of the Liberation Army of the South during the Mexican Revolution (b. 1876)
 21 July – Pedro Lascuráin, 34th President of Mexico for 45 minutes in 1914 (b. 1856)

References

 
Mexico